Virilastacus is a genus of freshwater burrowing crayfish species endemic to Chile. It has four described species. The first species was described in 1914, but since 2005, three other species have been added to this genus.

Species
Virilastacus araucanius Faxon, 1914 
Virilastacus jarai Erich H. Rudolph and Keith A. Crandall, 2012
Virilastacus retamali Erich H. Rudolph and Keith A. Crandall, 2007
Virilastacus rucapihuelensis Rudolph and Crandall, 2005

References

Parastacidae
Freshwater crustaceans of South America
Endemic fauna of Chile
Edible crustaceans
Decapod genera
Taxa named by Horton H. Hobbs Jr.